Millbrook is a historic home and farm complex located near Crewe, Nottoway County, Virginia. The original section of the Federal-style main house was built about 1840, and expanded to its present size about 1855. It is a balanced two-story, five-bay, center-hall plan I-house with a Greek Revival-style centered front porch and English basement with three finished floors above. Also on the property are a contributing tobacco barn ruin, and four restored contributing buildings: kitchen, smokehouse, hay barn, and dairy.

It was listed on the National Register of Historic Places in 2010.

References

Houses on the National Register of Historic Places in Virginia
Farms on the National Register of Historic Places in Virginia
Federal architecture in Virginia
Greek Revival houses in Virginia
Houses completed in 1840
Houses in Nottoway County, Virginia
National Register of Historic Places in Nottoway County, Virginia